Karin Sjögren (born 9 September 1960) is a Swedish female curler.

In 1982 she was inducted into the Swedish Curling Hall of Fame.

Teams

References

External links
 

Living people
1960 births
Swedish female curlers
World curling champions
European curling champions
Swedish curling champions